The Communist Party of Suriname was a communist party in Suriname.

It was founded in 1973. The party was pro-Albanian in its political position. The party ran candidates in the 1977 Surinamese election under the label "Democratic People's Front". No member of the party was ever elected to political office in Suriname. Bram Behr, the leader of the party, was imprisoned in 1982 for criticizing the government and executed. The party published a journal called Modro. It had about 25 members in 1985. After the Cold War ended, the party died out.

References

Defunct political parties in Suriname
Communism in Suriname
Suriname
Political parties established in 1973